The Palace of Lourizán is a manor house in Herbalonga in the civil parish of Lourizán, in Pontevedra, Spain.

History 
In the 15th century this property was transformed into a farm. The circular crenellated dovecote dates from this period.

In the 17th century, the estate, known as Granja de la Sierra, was owned by the Marquisate of La Sierra. Later it had different owners, merchants and businessmen. In the 19th century, the palace belonged to Buenaventura Marcó del Pont Bori, after he bought it from the heirs of Francisco Genaro Ángel, his wife's brother.

Later it was converted into a main residence and a summer cottage when Eugenio Montero Ríos lived there. In October 1876 he rented the estate and acquired it on 16 May 1879. At that time the estate was very close to the ria of Pontevedra and had its own pier. Between 1893 and 1894, the first major refurbishment of the manor house was carried out. It consisted of creating a wooden gallery in the south wing, which enclosed the building's chapel. The Treaty of Paris was signed in its rooms after the war with the United States in 1898, in which Spain lost Cuba, Puerto Rico, the Philippines and Guam.

The architect Jenaro de la Fuente Domínguez was commissioned to completely renovate the palace in the early 20th century. The project's façade plan dates from 20 February 1909 and it integrated and harmonised elements from different stages of construction to create an architectural unity. The refurbishment gave the palace a new appearance, both on the outside and inside. Work began in September 1909. Eugenio Montero Ríos lived in the Lourizán Palace until his death in 1914.

The Provincial Council of Pontevedra bought it in 1943 from the Provincial Savings Bank of Pontevedra and (a fifth) from the widowed Marquise of Alhucemas, daughter of Montero Ríos. That same year, the Provincial Council handed it over to the Ministry of Education to be used as a regional centre for teaching, research and forestry experiments, and in 1946 it became a higher technical school of forestry.

The centre became part of the National Agricultural Research Institute (INIA) in 1973 and in 1984 it was transferred to the Xunta de Galicia. It is currently integrated into the Centre for Sustainable Development of the Regional Ministry of the Environment since 1991. The main objectives of the Environmental and Forestry Research Centre of Lourizán are the protection, conservation and improvement of Galicia's forestry heritage.

Description

The building 
The present building has a romantic air and is the work of Jenaro de la Fuente Domínguez. It is an eclectic building with influences from Art Nouveau, Classicism and the French architecture of the Second Empire.

The structure of the palace is symmetrical, monumental and with a predominance of horizontal volumes. It has a ground floor and two upper floors. The central body is U-shaped with three towers crowned by French mansards and slate roof. The facade has Ionic columns and pilasters. The central part is enhanced by a coat of arms and a clock, in the place where the coats of arms of Galician manor houses are usually found.

In front of this central body is a large two-flight imperial stone staircase, surrounded by neoclassical white marble statues personifying justice and prudence and representing virtues, values and devotions. This staircase leads to the main entrance and to a semicircular terrace (which serves as a viewpoint) above an artificial grotto that simulates a volcanic limestone cave called the Grotto of Mirrors. At this point, two side wings open up, consisting of light long galleries of stone and glass that envelop the old pazo. On the first floor, the facades of the side wings give way to the central body and create terraces with balustrades.

The large number of windows and balconies stand out, bringing light and lightness to the structure. The decoration is remarkable for the fusion of neoclassical and Art Nouveau elements. The columns, balconies and ornaments show classical resources. The triangular pediment of the central body is decorated with the symbols of the profession of Eugenio Montero Ríos, and the attributes of justice, a shield with a book and a feather.

The interior is accessed through a simple door with the initials of its former owners, "E and A", "Eugenio and Avelina".

The estate 
The manor house has 54 hectares of gardens and groves, which show the different uses to which it has been put over the centuries: farm, seigneurial botanical garden and forestry research centre.

Many native trees grow here, such as oaks, chestnuts and Birches, sycamores and introduced and exotic trees, such as Cypresses, Araucarias, cedars, magnolias or common privet, many of which were brought by French gardeners. Several of these trees are included in the Catalogue of Singular Trees of the Galician Government. There are arboretums with all varieties of chestnut trees, pines, eucalyptus or camellias, with the tallest specimen in the world, a 20.5 metre tall Japanese camellia. There is also a rimu from New Zealand and a small Taiwanese garden.

Around the palace there are granaries on stilts, a 15th century dovecote, a glass greenhouse with an iron structure from 1900, a one-piece granite table (apparently extracted from a rock on the island of Tambo), white marble statues and several fountains, such as that of the Shell, that of the Three Channels, that of the Patio and that of the Cave of Mirrors. The estate is organised into avenues: the Camellia Avenue, the Eucalyptus Avenue and the Cave of Mirrors Avenue.

The art nouveau greenhouse from the early 20th century is made of glass and wrought iron and the Galician attic with its threshing floor and dryer has 16 feet.

Culture 
The writer Lola Fernández Pazos published the novel El Pazo de Lourizán in 2022, which is set in the palace.

The island of Tambo was once part of the palace's territory. Montero Ríos bought three fifths of the island in 1884 and another fifth in 1894. In 1940, his children sold it to the Navy for use by the Naval Military Academy.

Gallery

References

See also

Bibliography

Related articles 
 Arboretum of Lourizán
 Palace of the Deputation of Pontevedra
 Pazo

External links 
 The Lourizán Palace, on the website Visit-Pontevedra
 
 The pazo of trees, on the Diputación de Pontevedra website.
 

Palaces in Galicia (Spain)
Monuments and memorials in Spain
Buildings and structures in Pontevedra
Art Nouveau
Eclectic architecture